Oral history preservation is the field that deals with the care and upkeep of oral history materials, whatever format they may be in. Oral history is a method of historical documentation, using interviews with living survivors of the time being investigated. Oral history often touches on topics scarcely touched on by written documents, and by doing so, fills in the gaps of records that make up early historical documents.

Collecting oral history 

The earliest method of collecting oral history was through memory. (see: oral tradition)
With the loss of elders who were willing to preserve and pass along these histories, cultural memories began to vanish.

With the advent of the written word, it became possible for cultures to preserve their history without the memory of a select few. Spoken word was transcribed, and the eyewitness accounts of those who lived through both significant and everyday events were able to be saved for future generations to study.

This method of historical preservation was augmented with the invention of different methods to record sound. Spoken word can now be recorded on audio or video tape, or through newer digital methods.

While new media allows for richer histories to be saved, it also comes with greater issues for preservationists, one such issue being that of copyright and the ethical concerns that come along with it. For all intents and purposes, copyright does not exist in oral testimonies, at least not as clearly as it does in written documents. It is hard to decide who holds the rights to the materials and how they should be handled.  There are ways to combat copyright and ethical concerns and restrictions, however. One such way is through a letter of intent. Users sign this document before listening to an oral history recording in order to demonstrate that they understand and have agreed to the usage restrictions put in place by the institution.

Medium

Past ways of saving oral histories 

Early methods of recording sound included phonograph cylinders (a stylus would draw wax grooves on the outside of a cylinder), gramophone records (grooves on the flat side of a disk) and magnetic recordings.

Current way to save oral histories 

While reel-to-reel audio tape recordings are still used, video recordings have become standard. This allows the researcher to take body language and facial expressions (both important means of communication in themselves) into account. There is also an emerging trend to use the telephone to make audio journals when distance prevents face-to-face contact.

In order to ensure the preservation of oral histories it is important that all work is properly transcribed and stored on reliable media. It is important to preserve oral histories in modern digital format to ensure longevity and usability.  The simplest and easiest way to do this for audio histories is to purchase a "personal MP3 player" that has recording capabilities, and record directly to the flash chip in the player.  These are very inexpensive and can hold many hours of interviews.  The files should then be uploaded to a central computer server and copies can be burned to optical media, or copied to USB flash drives owned by the researchers, scholars and students working with the material.

Recordable compact discs are commonly used over magnetic tape for the preservation of oral histories over a long period of time.  Compact Cassette tapes and Videotape were popular but have been almost completely replaced by optical media such as CD-R and DVD media.  CD-R is a successful technology that has proven its reliability over period of time, but it should be viewed with caution for long term storage as the media is easily scratched.  The safest way is to make a "gold master" CD that is not ever checked out for use from the library, and duplicate copies of this for use by people wishing to access it.  The Folk Heritage Collections, at the Library of Congress, set a standard for 24 bits when digitizing music. This creates "superb" sound and has a high level of detail (Danielson, 2001). The Library of Congress uses CD-R as one of its storage methods. The Library of Congress has a higher budget than many university or archives, therefore they are able to store materials in multiple places. But, the Library of Congress has stated that they do believe storing sound on CD-R is a safe storage method (Danielson, 2001). One can assume if it is considered safe by the Library of Congress it is a relatively safe method of preservation.

A huge challenge of oral history preservation today is the battle with digital obsolescence. There is an obvious link between oral history preservation and digital preservation. Oral histories are often recorded on an assortment of tapes which are ultimately transferred onto computerized, or digitized, formats in order to facilitate their longevity. These digitized formats then have to be preserved, along with their corresponding metadata, just as any other digital objects are. Technological advances are happening everyday and it is difficult to keep up with these changes.  Emulation and migration are two ways in which formats can be changed in order to be of use for longer. Emulation focuses on designing hardware and software that will imitate the old system so that it can accept the old files while migration focuses on fitting preserved data into a smaller number of formats that can still encode the complexities of the structure and form of the original format.

With the recent cost decreases in hard disk drives, oral archivists are considering moving many of their popular holdings to permanent storage in a server farm.  For example, a single terabyte disk drive costing under $100 USD can hold 1,900 hours of uncompressed audio.  A CD-R by contrast can only hold 76 minutes of uncompressed audio.  Disk drive array cards such as the 3ware 9650SE can field 8TB of redundantly protected data in a standard PC case.  One of the big advantages of doing this is that as the servers age and are retired, the files can simply be copied to newer, larger replacement servers making hardware obsolescence a thing of the past.

Basic preservation of the collection

Oral history education
Due to the growing importance of oral histories the United States, as well as the international community, have increased funding to produce more oral histories, preserve oral history collections, and train oral historians. There are a growing number of oral history programs and classes in college and university campus across America. Although Indiana University does not offer academic degrees in oral history The Center for the Study of History and Memory offers students the opportunity to take classes on the topic. Some of the major universities that offer classes or degrees in oral history are Columbia University, University of Kentucky, and University of California Los Angeles. Many international universities and organizations are also enhancing their programs. The United Kingdom, Canada, and Australia, have all established oral history associations and offer educational classes on the subject. These programs are aimed at educating future oral historians on key issues relating to oral history, such as preservation. This is a highly debated subject matter, due to increasing technology and funding.

General 
The basic preservation rule for oral histories is that the repository must make three copies each of the oral history, of the transcript, and of all accompanying paperwork (summaries and copyright statements).

 One copy will be the original item
 One copy will be the duplicating master
 One copy will be the access (public use) copy

Paper records 
Transcripts of oral histories can facilitate their dissemination to the public. There are a few basic rules for paper (transcript) preservation of an oral history collection:

 Make sure transcriptions are created on acid-free paper.
 Save original transcript, and make copies for public use. Do not loan out original.
 Store paper copies of transcriptions in archival-quality, acid free boxes.

Magnetic records 
There are a few basic rules for magnetic recording preservation of an oral history collection:

 Save the original tape as well as the transcript of the interview
 Make an audio copy for public use, do not allow an original to be used
 Store tapes away from magnetic fields
 Discourage users from fast forwarding and rewinding the audio tapes, this adds unnecessary wear and tear
 Remember that master copies must be played every once in a while to ensure they are still viable
The environment must also maintain a humidity level between 40-50% relative humidity (RH).

Digital preservation 
There are many different digital preservation strategies, but no one strategy has been agreed upon as appropriate for all data types or institutions.

Oral history archives 
Oral history materials are often stored in archival repositories that facilitate their preservation and longevity. Archival repositories are kept at the correct temperature to store oral history materials and trained professionals are there to ensure that the formats of the materials are kept up to date. Archivists, Preservationists and Conservators are in a unique position to appraise the shortcomings of existing archival records and to subsequently know what value can be made by oral history materials.

See also
Intangible cultural heritage
Oral history
Oral tradition

Notes

References

Keakopa, M. (1998). The role of the archivist in the collection and preservation of oral traditions. S.A. Archives Journal, 40,87-93.
Knoke, P.J., Schneider, W., & Mudd, I. (1990). PROJECT JUKEBOX: technology for oral history preservation and access. Audiovisual Librarian, 7(2), 108-113.
Soete, G.J. (1997). Transforming libraries: Issues and innovations in preserving digital information. Washington, DC: Association of Research Libraries.
Worthington, J. (2003). Preservation of oral sources: An analysis of the methods employed by the Sinomlando Project, University of Natal, for the preservation of oral sources. S.A. Archives Journal, 43, 33-41.

Further reading 

Baranowski, Richard, and Teresa Calderone. "Reconnecting the Past through Oral History", Public Libraries 43.2 (2004): 109-12.
Byers, F. (Oct, 2003). Care and handling of CDs and DVDs: A guide for librarians and archivists. Washington, D.C.: Council on Library and Information Resources.
Bulger, Peggy. "Preserving the Past Through America's Voices: Oral History at the American Folklife Center." Library of Congress Information Bulletin, 64.6/7/8 (2006): 140-1, 153.
Danielson, V. (May, 2001). Folk Heritage Collections in Crisis. Washington, D.C.: Council on Library and Information Resources.
Dickinson, L. (2002). Oral History Association. Retrieved on June 8, 2008 <http://alpha.dickinson.edu/oha/>
Gregg, Alison. "Planning and managing an oral history collection", Australasian Public Libraries and Information Services 13.4 (2000): 173-9.
Hall, Wendy. "Oral history fast forward: from audiocassette to digital archive", Colorado Libraries 26.4 (2000): 9-10.
Pinnell-Stephens, June. "Saving the Stories: Alaska libraries rescue two Native oral history resources", American Libraries 36.11 (2005): 46-7.
Sharpless, Rebecca. (2008).The history of oral history. In T.L. Charlton (Ed.), Thinking about oral history: Theories and applications (pp. 7–32). Plymouth, England: Alta Mira Press.
Van Bogart, J.W.C. (June, 1995). Magnetic tape storage and handling: A guide for libraries and archivists.   Washington, D.C.: The Commission on Preservation and Access.
Webb, C. & K. Bradley. (1997)  Preserving Oral History Recordings. Retrieved on June 8, 2008  < http://www.ariadne.ac.uk/issue8/oral-history/>
(2007). Oral History Association of Australia. Retrieved on June 8, 2008 <https://web.archive.org/web/20160303201528/http://www.ohaa.net.au/>

External links 
 Oral History Society
 Oral History Association
 Digital Australia: Preserving Oral History Recordings
 Louie B. Nunn Center for Oral History, University of Kentucky 
 Cornell Digital Preservation
 Oral History at MIT
 Oral History at UF
 National Film and Sound Archives
 Preserving my Heritage: Sound Recordings

Oral history